Max Fischer is a Canadian screenwriter and film director known for such films as The Lucky Star, Killing 'em Softly, Wet Dreams and Deception.

References

External links

Living people
Canadian male screenwriters
English-language film directors
Canadian film directors
20th-century Canadian screenwriters
Year of birth missing (living people)